Garbanotas (The Curly One) is a Lithuanian neo-psychedelia rock and indie folk rock band, which started playing in 2008. The band consists of four members, vocalist Šarūnas Joneikis, guitarist Mantas Joneikis, Bassist Kipras Pugačiukas and drummer Mantas Augustaitis. Their first EP, Venera, was released in 2012. Their first album, Above Us, was released in 2015 on Pappa Goose Records. In 2016, the band won the Best Alternative Act in the Lithuanian M.A.M.A. awards. Garbanotas mainly perform in their homeland Lithuania but also toured around the Baltic states and Europe. Their next album Room For You was released on 7 December 2017 with two singles "Last Summer’s Day" and "Long Ago Far Away". After a year of touring and playing live across Lithuania and Europe, Garbanotas announced the release of their fourth album Paskutinė Saulė (The Last Sun), at the start of November 2018. Also, unexpectedly Garbanotas changed their name overnight on all social media platforms from “Garbanotas Bosistas” to “Garbanotas”. Their fourth album was released on 3 December 2018 which consists of only Lithuanian songs. The cover art of the album Paskutine Saulė was designed by the band's lead vocalist Šarukas Joneikis.

History 
Šarūnas Joneikis and Mantas Joneikis are brothers and were both born in Vilnius. Both studied at Vilnius University. They started playing the guitar at a young age, and ultimately started creating songs in their 20s. The inspiration came mostly from Queen, The Beatles, Led Zeppelin, Arklio Galia and Senas Kuinas. The band name came from an idea of a bassist with curly hair  not because of his looks, but more about the personality and attitude towards music, also because the Joneikis brothers were jealous of people with curly hair when they were younger. Later Augustinas Čobotas and Narimantas Besakirskas joined the band and soon they decided to use their own material which resulted in the release of their first EP Venera in 2012.

After two years of live performances and also appearing in such music projects as "Kaunas acoustics", LRT Opus live, "Vilnius temperature", and also in Latvia's biggest music festival Positivus, Garbanotas bosistas started recording their new album called Above Us and before that, Kipras Pugačiukas and Jonas Narbutas joined the band replacing the previous bassist and drummer. The band's sound also changed from indie folk to psychedelic rock. Their first Lithuanian song "Gėlėta Suknia" came from the new album in the spring of 2015, and finally the album was released on 4 May 2015. The following year the band toured around Europe and the Baltics presenting their new album and played at The Great Escape Festival, Liverpool Sound City festival, Sofar Sounds London and Oxford, England. As of 2 April 2016, Garbanotas Bosistas became the first Lithuanian - indie psychedelic rock band to play at the Tallinn music week festival.

Members
 Šarukas Joneikis – vocals, guitar, synths
 Mantas Joneikis – guitar, backing vocals, synths
 Kipras Pugačiukas – bass, backing vocals, synths
 Mantas Augustaitis - drums, backing vocals, synths 

Additional live members
 Gabrielė Tamutytė –  vocals

Discography
 Venera EP (2012)
 Above Us (2015)
 Room for You (2017)
 Paskutinė Saulė (2018)
 Kūnas Dangaus (2023)

Awards and nominations

M.A.M.A. awards

|-
|rowspan="3"|2016
|rowspan="2"| "Garbanotas Bosistas"
|Alternative act of the year
|
|}

References

External links 
 

Lithuanian rock music groups
Lithuanian musical groups
Neo-psychedelia groups
Indie folk groups
Musical groups established in 2008
2008 establishments in Lithuania